"Life's What You Make It" is a song by the English band Talk Talk. It was released as a single in 1985, the first from the band's album The Colour of Spring. The single was a hit in the UK, peaking at No. 16, and charted in numerous other countries, often reaching the Top 20.

Artist James Marsh created the single's cover illustration. The track was re-released as a single in 1990, charting for a second time.

Conception
The song was one of the last to be conceived for The Colour of Spring, following concern from the band's management at the lack of an obvious single among accumulated work. Initially unwilling, Mark Hollis and Tim Friese-Greene, the principal source of original material for the band, accepted the task as a challenge. Friese-Greene: "I had a drum pattern loosely inspired by Kate Bush's 'Running Up That Hill' and Mark was playing 'Green Onions' organ over the top." (Making No. 3 in the UK Singles Chart, "Running Up That Hill" had been released in August 1985.) The track was embellished with David Rhodes' guitar hook.

Personnel

Talk Talk
Mark Hollis – lead vocal, piano
Paul Webb – backing vocals
Lee Harris – drums

Additional musicians
Martin Ditcham – percussion
Tim Friese-Greene – organ, Mellotron
David Rhodes – guitar

Track listings

 1985/86 single
 7" / 12"
 "Life's What You Make It" – 4:25 (7") / (extended version) – 8:16 (12")
 "It's Getting Late in the Evening" – 5:43

 12" (double)
 "Life's What You Make It" (extended version) – 8:16
 "It's Getting Late in the Evening" – 5:43
 "It's My Life" – 6:16
 "Does Caroline Know?" – 4:33
 "It's My Life" – 3:50

 12"
 "Life's What You Make It" (extended version) – 6:58
 "Life's What You Make It" (early mix) – 6:39
 "It's Getting Late in the Evening" – 5:43

 12" (U.S.)
 "Life's What You Make It" (extended mix) – 6:54
 "It's Getting Late in the Evening" (7" version) – 5:44
 "Life's What You Make It" (dub version) – 6:06
|valign="top"|

 1990 single
 7" / cassette
 "Life's What You Make It" – 4:26
 "Life's What You Make It" (live from Hammersmith Odeon) – 4:41

 12"
 "Life's What You Make It" (the BBG remix) – 6:14
 "Life's What You Make It" – 4:26
 "Tomorrow Started" (live from Hammersmith Odeon) – 7:45

 CD
 "Life's What You Make It" – 4:29
 "Tomorrow Started" (live from Hammersmith Odeon) – 7:47
 "Life's What You Make It" (live from Hammersmith Odeon) – 4:41

 12"
 "Life's What You Make It" (the Fluke remix) – 6:16
 "Life's What You Make It" (the Dominic Woosey remix) – 8:21

Charts

1Remix

Cover versions
In 2009, "Life's What You Make It" was covered by Australian rock musician Rowland S. Howard for his final solo album Pop Crimes.
 
For the 2012 benefit tribute album Spirit of Talk Talk, "Life's What You Make It" was covered by singer-songwriter Duncan Sheik in a duet with Rachael Yamagata. In 2011 the Danish band Dúné recorded the song for the film ID:A.

More recently, a Placebo cover version of "Life's What You Make It" featured on both a double A-side (with "Jesus' Son") and the band's Life's What You Make It EP in 2016. American rock band Joywave covered the song for a Spotify Singles release for the music streaming service in 2018.

In popular culture
The track appeared in the 2002 video game Grand Theft Auto: Vice City, where it plays on the fictional in-game pop radio station Flash FM.

References

1985 songs
1985 singles
1986 singles
1990 singles
EMI Records singles
Songs written by Mark Hollis (musician)
Songs written by Tim Friese-Greene
Song recordings produced by Tim Friese-Greene
Talk Talk songs
Music videos directed by Tim Pope